The joint-stock company State Export-Import Bank of Ukraine or Ukreximbank is one of three 100% state-owned systemically important banks in Ukraine (together with Savings Bank and PrivatBank).

The bank was founded in January 1992 with its headquarters in Kyiv. Bank services a considerable proportion of export and import activities. It acts as the sole financial agent of the Government of Ukraine with respect to loans from foreign financial institutions, which are originated, borrowed or guaranteed by Ukraine. Ukreximbank has the widest amidst Ukrainian bank's foreign network of correspondents. Bank network includes 83 branches, 692 ATMs and SSTs (as of January 2017) covering all regions of Ukraine. Ukreximbank also has offices in London and New York.

According to the British magazine The Banker, in 2014 Ukreximbank ranked eleventh in the ranking of the largest banks in Central and Eastern Europe and 388th in the ranking of the top 1,000 world banks.

During the political and economic crisis of 2014-15, Ukreximbank suffered the largest losses in its history. In 2014, they reached ₴9.8 billion, and in 2015 they increased to 14.1 billion. In the bank's report for 2015, the main reasons for such losses are the depreciation of assets due to the economic crisis and losses from exchange rate differences on foreign currency transactions.

In April 2015, the bank successfully extended its 2015 eurobonds  despite objections from a group of bondholders including Bence Sardi that advocated the full repayment of the notes in time. The bank had the capacity to pay, but refused, requesting  extension on the grounds the government needed to adhere to liquidity targets specified in the IMF request for aid.

The bank posted $561 million in loss in 2015, which was 25.6% up on the $446 million loss of 2014.

In 2019, the bank received a net profit of ₴1 billion according to the National Bank of Ukraine.

In November 2020, the Resolution of the Cabinet of Ministers of Ukraine No. 1085 dated 4 November 2020 entered into force, according to which Ukreximbank changed its full name from a public joint stock company to a joint stock company by amending the Bank's Charter.

In 2021, the bank received the largest profit in its history — over two billion UAH.

Ratings and awards 
In 2020, Ukreximbank was included in the rating of Global Finance "The safest banks in the world in 2020".

At the fifth International Finance Corporation (IFC) Partner Banks Meeting in Dubai, JSC Ukreximbank was recognized as the best issuing bank in Europe and Central Asia for pre-export finance in 2012 under the Global Trade Finance Program.

In October 2012, Ukreximbank was ranked first in terms of reliability in the updated data of the First Ukrainian Deposit Index (FUDI). It was the only one among all financial institutions to receive A rating, which is characterized as "The highest reliability among Ukrainian banks. Low sensitivity to adverse external factors".

In August 2012, in the rating "Guardian of Corporate Brands — 2012" (publishing house "Galician Contracts") Ukreximbank's brand was estimated at UAH 30 billion — the most expensive financial brand in Ukraine.

Ukreximbank topped the rating of bank deposits reliability as of the beginning of 2012, published by the "Real Economy" publication — the state financial institution has won this rating for the fifth time in a row. Rating "A" indicates a combination of strong financial indicators — the dynamics of equity, capital to assets, profitability and long-term dynamics of deposits. The rating of banks attractiveness for depositors is an information project aimed at a comprehensive assessment of the largest banks in Ukraine in terms of assets. It takes into account the most important factors of attractiveness of institutions for depositors, which can be calculated on the basis of public information.

Gallery

See also 

List of banks in Ukraine

References

External links

  

Banks of Ukraine
Ukrainian companies established in 1992
Banks established in 1992
Companies based in Kyiv
Ukrainian brands
Government-owned companies of Ukraine
Ukraine